Cinthia Pamela González Medina (born 28 August 1995) is a Uruguayan footballer who plays as a midfielder for Spanish Primera Federación club Granada CF and the Uruguay women's national team.

Club career
González previously played in the Campeonato Uruguayo for Nacional Montevideo and Colón.

International career
González represented Uruguay in the 2014 and 2018 editions of the Copa América.

International goals
Scores and results list Uruguay's goal tally first

Titles
 Uruguayan Championship (2): 2013, 2014.

References

External links
Pamela González at BDFútbol

1995 births
Living people
Footballers from Paysandú
Uruguayan women's footballers
Women's association football midfielders
Colón F.C. players
Club Nacional de Football players
Málaga CF Femenino players
Granada CF (women) players
Primera División (women) players
Segunda Federación (women) players
Uruguay women's international footballers
Uruguayan expatriate women's footballers
Uruguayan expatriate sportspeople in Spain
Expatriate women's footballers in Spain